The Central Taiwan Innovation Campus (CTIC) is a research center in Zhongxing New Village, Nantou City, Nantou County, Taiwan.

History
The construction of the building was completed in September 2014. In August 2017, the building received the Diamond Class Green Building and Intelligent Building rating by the Ministry of the Interior based on several indicators.

Architecture
The building total surface covers an area of 42,700 m2 on a 2.47 hectares of land. The building was constructed entirely by metal-framed curtain wall. The shape of the building resembles a sliced open of a ground layer. It also features a greenhouse at its southern-east side.

See also
 Education in Taiwan
 Industrial Technology Research Institute

References

External links
  

2014 establishments in Taiwan
Buildings and structures completed in 2014
Buildings and structures in Nantou County
Research institutes in Taiwan